Millot Abena Pokuaa (born 10 October 2001) is a Ghanaian professional footballer who plays as a forward for Ghana Women's Premier League side Hasaacas Ladies and the Ghana women's national football team. She represented Ghana at the U17 level at World Cups in 2018.

Career 
Pokuaa joined Hasaacas Ladies in 2019. She was called up for the first time into the Ghana women's national football team in 2020 for the 2020 CAF Women's Olympic Qualifying Tournament.

References

External links 

 
 

Living people
2001 births
Ghanaian women's footballers
Women's association football forwards
Ghana women's international footballers
Hasaacas Ladies F.C. players